Orotina is a district of the Orotina canton, in the Alajuela province of Costa Rica.

Geography 
Orotina has an area of  km2 and an elevation of  metres. It is in a relatively flat section on the west side of the coastal mountain range of Costa Rica, It is 26 kilometers northeast of the Pacific Ocean at Tárcoles, 48 kilometers southwest of the provincial capital city of Alajuela, and 66 kilometers from the national capital city of San Jose.

Demographics 

For the 2011 census, Orotina had a population of  inhabitants.

Transportation

Road transportation 
With the National Route 27 completed the time it takes to get from the capital to Orotina is just about 45 minutes, instead of the 80–90 minutes it used to take.

The district is covered by the following road routes:
 National Route 3
 National Route 27
 National Route 137
 National Route 757

Airport plans
In 2017 the Government confirmed that Costa Rica's New Metropolitan International Airport will be built in Orotina in 2027. However, by December 2019, the plans were shelved indefinitely.

Schools
 Primo Vargas Valverde: an elementary school located across from the town park.
 Instituto Agropecuario de Orotina: a secondary school.
 Sistema Educativo Santa Fe Pacific: Kirden Garten, Elementary and High School
 San Rafael Highschool: High School
 Little People School: bilingual preschool.

References 

Districts of Alajuela Province
Populated places in Alajuela Province